Forus Travbane is a harness racing track located at Forus in Stavanger, Norway. Owned by Norwegian Trotting Association, its tote betting is handled by Norsk Rikstoto. The venue opened in 1920.

References

External links
 Official website

Sports venues in Stavanger
Harness racing venues in Norway
Event venues established in 1920
1920 establishments in Norway